Basic Volume is the debut studio album by English electronic artist Gaika. It was released in July 2018 under Warp Records.

Accolades

Track listing

References

2018 debut albums
Albums produced by Jam City